The 2022 AFF Beach Soccer Championship is the fourth edition of the AFF Beach Soccer Championship, the premier regional beach soccer championship. This edition will features three of the members of the ASEAN Football Federation (AFF).

Organised by the AFF, the tournament takes place between 28 September and 1 October in Pattaya, Thailand, featuring three teams.

Thailand are the defending champions.

Teams

Group stage 
All times are local time: UTC+7.

Winners

References

External links
AFF BEACH SOCCER CHAMPIONSHIP, at aseanfootball.org

AFF Beach Soccer Championship
2022 in beach soccer
International association football competitions hosted by Thailand
AFF
AFF
AFF